Pickett Civilian Conservation Corps Memorial State Park (also known simply as Pickett State Park or Pickett CCC Memorial State Park) is a Tennessee state park in the upper Cumberland Mountains. It is located in Pickett County, northeast of the city of Jamestown, and is adjacent to the Big South Fork National River and Recreation Area. About  are managed by the Tennessee Department of Environment and Conservation as a state park, and the remainder of the property is managed by the Tennessee Division of Forestry as a state forest.

CCC crews built hiking trails, a recreation lodge, a ranger station, five rustic cabins, and a  lake known as Arch Lake. Locally quarried sandstone was used in constructing most of the buildings. The original park facilities are listed on the National Register of Historic Places. Pickett's land area has increased over time as a result of additional land donations and acquisitions, and additional park facilities were built beginning in the 1950s.

In 2015, Pickett State Park was classed as a Dark Sky Park by the International Dark-sky Association. These are areas generally free of artificial light pollution, making them optimal places for stargazing.

The park offers boating, camping, lodging, hiking and many other activities.

Facilities
The park's facilities include 32 campsites and 20 rental cabins.  The campsites come with electric and water hookups and have both picnic tables and grills. The campground has a modern bathhouse and a dump station. It is open year-round on a first-come, first-served basis, with a maximum stay limit of two weeks. Of the 20 cabins, there are four types. The first is a rustic CCC cabin that accommodates four people, the second is a Deluxe Cabin that will accommodate up to six people, the third is a Chalet cabin that will accommodate two people, and the last is a Villa cabin that can accommodate up to eight people. Each cabin comes with the following amenities:
Full Modern Bathrooms
Kitchen Appliances
Cooking Utensils
Linens and Towels
Fireplaces
All cabins are available by reservation (up to one year in advance) year round, excepting two rustic units. One deluxe cabin is designated as a pet cabin.

Attractions
At Hazard Cave, the park is home to a species of glow worm discovered in 1975, that is found only in very particular places in the United States, another place being the Big South Fork National Recreation Area. The glow worms are in fact insect larvae of the fungus gnat (Ofelia fultoni). In the dark confines of the Hazard Cave rock house, these glow worms emit blue, glowing light on the cave walls and the surrounding vegetation. These larvae can be seen throughout the year, but are the best and brightest in the early weeks of June.

References

External links

Pickett State Park official website
Pickett State Rustic Park, Tennessee Encyclopedia of History and Culture

State parks of Tennessee
Protected areas of Pickett County, Tennessee
National Register of Historic Places in Pickett County, Tennessee
Civilian Conservation Corps in Tennessee
Historic districts on the National Register of Historic Places in Tennessee
Places with bioluminescence